Lehtinen is a Finnish surname. Notable people with the surname include:

 Alex Lehtinen (born 1996), Finnish footballer
 Dexter Lehtinen (born 1946), American attorney and law professor
 Eino Lehtinen (1900–2007), Finnish centenarian, one of the last surviving veterans of the Finnish Civil War
 Helena Lehtinen (born 1952), Finnish jeweller
 Inkeri Lehtinen (1908–1997), Finnish politician
 Jani Lehtinen (born 1974), Finnish racewalker
 Jarmo Lehtinen (born 1969), Finnish rally co-driver
 Jarmo Lehtinen (commentator), Finnish sports commentator and journalist
 Jere Lehtinen (born 1973), Finnish professional ice hockey forward
 Jutta Lehtinen (born 1983), Finnish actress
 Kai Lehtinen (born 1958), Finnish actor
 Kalle Lehtinen (born 1968), Finnish footballer
 Lasse Lehtinen (born 1947), Finnish politician
 Lauri Lehtinen (1908–1973), Finnish athlete
 Matti Lehtinen (1922–2022), Finnish operatic baritone
 Mika Lehtinen (born 1975), Finnish professional ice hockey defenceman
 Pekka T. Lehtinen, Finnish arachnologist
 Petteri Lehtinen (born 1973), Finnish medley swimmer
 Rauno Lehtinen (1932–2006), Finnish conductor and composer
 Rene Lehtinen (born 1985), Finnish motorcycle speedway rider 
 Sandra Lehtinen (1859–1954), Finnish politician 
 Timo Lehtinen, Finnish musician
 Toni Lehtinen (born 1984), Finnish professional football player
 Torsti Lehtinen (born 1942), Finnish writer and philosopher
 Tuija Lehtinen (born 1954), Finnish writer
 Ville Lehtinen (born 1978), Finnish footballer

See also
 Ros-Lehtinen

Finnish-language surnames